Mah Kord (also known as Kūshk-e va Mahkord and Mākurd) is a village in Miyan Deh Rural District, Shibkaveh District, Fasa County, Fars Province, Iran. At the 2006 census, its population was 30, in 7 families.

References 

Populated places in Fasa County